The Arts Council (sometimes called the Arts Council of Ireland; legally ) is the independent "Irish government agency for developing the arts."

About
It was established in 1951 by the Government of Ireland, to encourage interest in Irish art (including visual art, music, performance, and literature) and to channel funding from the state to Irish artists and arts organisations. This includes encouragement of traditional Irish arts, support for contemporary Irish arts, and finance for international arts events in Ireland. The council was modelled on the Arts Council of Great Britain, founded in 1946, and works closely with the Arts Council of Northern Ireland, formed by the British government in Northern Ireland in 1962 to fulfil a similar role.

The Arts Council is under the Department of Arts, Sport and Tourism. It is the main distributor of funding to artists and arts organisations in Ireland and also serves to advise the government on the arts.  It also funds the artists' organization Aosdána. They support architecture, dance, drama, film, literature, music, opera, community arts, street arts and spectacle, visual arts and other multidisciplinary projects. 

In 2011, they launched Culture Fox, an app and "online guide to Irish cultural events". The project was phased out in 2018.

As of 2023, and for the 3rd year in a row, the Arts Council receives €130 million in funding from the Irish government.

International policy
The Arts Council of Ireland is the official "Cultural Contact Point" between the EU Commission's Cultural Programme and Ireland.

The Arts Council of Ireland is a founding member of the International Federation of Arts Councils and Culture Agencies.

Visual Artists Ireland, the all-Ireland non-governmental organisation representing Irish artists nationally and internationally, is supported by the Arts Council of Ireland.

Members
The arts council consists of 12 members and a chair, each appointed for a five-year term by the Minister for Tourism, Culture, Arts, Gaeltacht, Sport and Media. Professor Kevin Rafter was appointed chair in 2019  The current director is Maureen Kennelly, appointed in 2020.
Prof. Kevin Rafter - Chair
Fearghus O’Conchuir - Deputy Chair
Paddy Glackin
Loughlin Deegan
Martina Moloney
Helen Shaw
Pádraig Ó Duinnín
Donall Curtin
Sinead Moriarty
Mark O’Kelly
Melatu Uche Okorie
Jillian van Turnhout
Teresa Buczkowska

Chair of the Arts Council
The Chair of the council is appointed for a five year term by the Minister for Tourism, Culture, Arts, Gaeltacht, Sport and Media.
 Monsignor Pádraig de Brún (1959–1960)
 Father Donal O’Sullivan SJ (1960–1973)
 Máire de Paor (1974–1978)
 Dr. Ciarán Benson (1993–1998)
 Dr. Brian Farrell (1998–2000)
 Patrick Murphy (2000–2003)
 Olive Braiden (2003–2009)
 Pat Moylan (2009–2014)
 Sheila Pratschke (2014–2019)
 Prof. Kevin Rafter (2019-2024)

See also
 Aosdána
 Culture Ireland
 Culture of Ireland
 Poetry Ireland

References

External links
 An Chomhairle Ealaíon/Arts Council of Ireland
 Arts Council of Northern Ireland
 Irish cultural events

Ireland, Arts Council of
Arts in Ireland
1951 establishments in Ireland
Cultural organisations based in the Republic of Ireland
Arts organizations established in 1951
Department of Tourism, Culture, Arts, Gaeltacht, Sport and Media